Agdistis gerasimovi is a moth of the family Pterophoridae. It is found in Central Asian riparian woodlands in Uzbekistan and Tajikistan.

References

Moths described in 1994
Agdistinae